The 1966 FIFA World Cup final was a football match played at Wembley Stadium in London on 30 July 1966 to determine the winner of the 1966 FIFA World Cup, the eighth FIFA World Cup. The match was contested by England and West Germany, with England winning 4–2 after extra time to claim the Jules Rimet Trophy. It was the first – and to date only – occasion that England has hosted or won the World Cup.

The match is remembered for England's only World Cup and first major international title, Geoff Hurst's hat-trick – the first scored in a FIFA World Cup final – and the dubious third goal awarded to England by referee Gottfried Dienst and linesman Tofiq Bahramov. The England team became known as the "wingless wonders", on account of their then-unconventional narrow attacking formation, described at the time as a 4–4–2.

In addition to an attendance of 96,924 at the stadium, the British television audience peaked at 32.3 million viewers, making it the United Kingdom's most-watched television event ever.

Road to the final 
Both teams were strong throughout the tournament. Each won two and drew one of their three matches in the group stages. England did not concede a goal until their semi-final against Portugal.

Match

Summary

Normal time

England, managed by Alf Ramsey and captained by Bobby Moore, won the toss and elected to kick off. After 12 minutes, Sigfried Held sent a cross into the English penalty area which Ray Wilson misheaded to Helmut Haller, who got his shot on target. Jack Charlton and goalkeeper Gordon Banks failed to deal with the shot which went in, making it 1–0 to West Germany.

In the 18th minute, Wolfgang Overath conceded a free kick, which Moore took immediately, floating a cross into the West German area, where Geoff Hurst rose unchallenged; his downward glancing header went into the net and levelled the scores at 1-1. The teams were level at half-time, and after 77 minutes England won a corner. Alan Ball delivered the ball to Geoff Hurst whose deflected shot from the edge of the area found Martin Peters. He produced the final shot, beating the West German keeper from eight yards to make the score 2–1 to England.

Germany pressed for an equaliser in the closing moments, and in the 89th minute Jack Charlton conceded a free kick for climbing on Uwe Seeler as they both went up for a header. The kick was taken by Lothar Emmerich, who struck it into George Cohen in the wall; the rebound fell to Held, who shot across the face of goal and into the body of Karl-Heinz Schnellinger. The ball deflected across the England six-yard box, wrong-footing the England defence and allowing Wolfgang Weber to level the score at 2–2 and force the match into extra time. Banks protested that the ball had struck Schnellinger on the arm, and reiterated the claim in his 2002 autobiography, but replays showed that it actually struck Schnellinger on the back.

Extra time

England pressed forward and created several chances. In particular, with five minutes gone, Bobby Charlton struck the post and sent another shot just wide. With 11 minutes of extra time gone, Alan Ball put in a cross and Geoff Hurst swivelled and shot from close range. The ball hit the underside of the crossbar, bounced down and was cleared. The referee Gottfried Dienst was uncertain if it had been a goal and consulted his linesman, Tofiq Bahramov from Azerbaijan in the USSR, who indicated that it was, and the Swiss referee awarded the goal to the home team. The crowd and the audience of 400 million television viewers were left arguing whether the goal should have been given or not. The crossbar is now on display in the Wembley Stadium. 

England's third goal has remained controversial ever since the match. According to the Laws of the Game the definition of a goal is when "the whole of the ball passes over the goal line". English supporters cited the good position of the linesman and the statement of Roger Hunt, the nearest England player to the ball, who claimed it was a goal and that was why he wheeled away in celebration rather than attempting to tap the rebounding ball in. Modern studies using film analysis and computer simulation have shown that the whole ball never crossed the line – only 50% did. Both Duncan Gillies of the Visual Information Processing Group at Imperial College London and Ian Reid and Andrew Zisserman of the Department of Engineering Science at University of Oxford have stated that the ball would have needed to travel a further 18±4 cm to fully cross the line. Some Germans cited possible bias of the Soviet linesman, especially as the USSR had just been defeated in the semi-finals by West Germany.

One minute before the end of play, the West Germans sent their defenders forward in a desperate attempt to score a last-minute equaliser. Winning the ball, Bobby Moore picked out the unmarked Geoff Hurst with a long pass, which Hurst carried forward while some spectators began streaming onto the field and Hurst, as he later revealed, tried to shoot the ball as far into the Wembley stands as he could, to waste time. He mishit that attempt, but the mishit went straight to the top corner of Hans Tilkowski's net, sealing a historic hattrick and winning the World Cup for England. The goal gave rise to one of the most famous calls in English football history, when BBC commentator Kenneth Wolstenholme described the situation as follows:

One of the balls from the final is on display in the National Football Museum in Manchester.

Details

Aftermath

Champions photograph and statue

One of the enduring images of the celebrations in Wembley immediately after the game was the picture of the captain Bobby Moore holding the Jules Rimet Trophy aloft, on the shoulders of Geoff Hurst and Ray Wilson, together with Martin Peters. In recognition of Moore and other West Ham United players' contribution to the win, the club and Newham Borough Council jointly commissioned a statue of this scene. On 28 April 2003 Prince Andrew as president of The Football Association, duly unveiled the World Cup Sculpture (also called The Champions) in a prominent place near West Ham's ground, at the time, the Boleyn Ground, at the junction of Barking Road and Green Street. The -high bronze piece was sculpted by Philip Jackson and weighed 4 tonnes.

Cultural impact

Broadcasting and viewership

The final is the most watched event ever on British television, as of July 2021, attracting 32.30 million viewers.

Influence
In Germany, a goal resulting from a shot bouncing off the crossbar and hitting the line is called a Wembley-Tor (Wembley Goal) due to the controversial nature of Hurst's second goal. This goal has been parodied many times. Some of the most notable include:

 England's third goal was referenced in a 2006 Adidas advertisement, where English midfielder Frank Lampard takes a shot at German keeper Oliver Kahn, and a similar event happens. On 27 June 2010 at that year's World Cup a similar goal by Lampard was wrongly disallowed (TV replays showed the ball landing past the goal line before bouncing away) which would have levelled the second-round game against Germany 2–2 (Germany won 4–1).
 Kenneth Wolstenholme's commentary on the third goal that bounced on the line, "It's a goal!" was used (along with the sound of breaking glass) in the tape-looped coda of an early version of The Beatles' song "Glass Onion", available on the album Anthology 3.

In August 1966 a special 4d stamp marked ENGLAND WINNERS was issued by the Royal Mail to celebrate the victory. It soared in value to up to 15 shillings each on the back of public enthusiasm for the victory before falling back in value when the public realised it was not rare.

Marking the 50th anniversary of England's World Cup victory in July 2016, ITV broadcast 1966 – A Nation Remembers, which was narrated by the actor Terence Stamp who attended every England game at the tournament.

The World Cup win features in the song "Three Lions" (known by its chorus "Football's Coming Home"), the unofficial anthem of the England football team. England's win in the final also helped fans to create the "Two World Wars and One World Cup" chant.

The match features in the fifth episode, (“Signal 30”) of season 5 of American period drama Mad Men, with one of the characters, Englishman Lane Pryce, watching and celebrating the game in a pub.

2009 receipt of winners medals
The players and staff of England's winning squad who did not get medals in 1966 received them on 10 June 2009 after a ceremony at 10 Downing Street in London. Initially, only the 11 players on the pitch at the end of the match received medals, but FIFA later awarded medals to every non-playing squad and staff member from every World Cup-winning country from 1930 to 1974.

See also
 England–Germany football rivalry
 Ghost goal
 Sixty Six (film), a 2006 film about the match

References

FIFA World Cup finals
Final
Fifa World Cup Final, 1966
England national football team matches
Germany national football team matches
Events at Wembley Stadium
Germany at the 1966 FIFA World Cup
Final
Final
FIFA World Cup Final
England–Germany football rivalry
International association football competitions hosted by London
Association football matches in England
FIFA World Cup Final
United Kingdom–West Germany relations